The Belair Mansion, located in the historic Collington area and in Bowie, Maryland, United States, built c. 1745, is the Georgian style plantation house of Provincial Governor of Maryland, Samuel Ogle. Later home to another Maryland governor, the mansion is listed on the National Register of Historic Places.

Belair is recognized as the only great colonial estate where breeding of race horses was conducted over the course of three centuries. The estate significantly influenced the development of thoroughbred horse racing in the new world, having one of only two stables to raise two Triple Crown champions. The mansion and its nearby stables both serve as museums, operated by the City of Bowie.

History

Early history
The original estate was  called Catton and was patented from the first proprietors of the Maryland Colony, the Calvert family, on August 26, 1681, by Robert Carvile of St. Mary's City, Maryland. Carvile sold the land in 1698 for £100 to Henry Ridgely. In 1700, Ridgely purchased an additional  adjacent to Catton called Enfield Chase. Upon Ridgely's death in 1710, his third wife, now twice widowed, Mary Ridgely (Duvall, née Stanton) was executrix of the will and inherited the properties. Mary had previously inherited Middle Plantation in Davidsonville, Maryland when her first husband, Mareen Duvall died in 1699.

Reverend Jacob Henderson, became rector of Queen Anne's Parish in 1712 and married Mary Duvall that same year.

In 1718, Henderson believed that Benjamin Cheney and Joseph Cheney had "committed some trespass" so on January 20, 1718, Henderson petitioned the Maryland Land office to resurvey the boundaries of his properties. As a result, in 1721, a new deed was issued to a much larger  and the property was renamed Belair (sometimes written as Bel Air).

Ogle era
Samuel Ogle, son of Samuel Ogle of Northumberland, descended from the Barons Ogle was appointed by Charles Calvert, 5th Baron Baltimore to be Governor of Maryland in Annapolis in 1732. As part of his remuneration, Ogle was given £3,000 to build a residence but Ogle, then a bachelor, was in no hurry to do so.

Ogle family ownership begins
Henderson sold the land along with two other parcels known as Woodcock's Range and Enfield Chase to two partners, Ogle, and Benjamin Tasker Sr. on March 30, 1737, for the sum of £500.

In August, that same year, Ogle bought Tasker's half of the property.  In 1739, the 47-year-old Ogle married his former partner's 18-year-old daughter, Anne Tasker.

Construction to Revolution

In 1740, Ogle was dispatched to England following England's declaration of war against Spain and left Tasker with power of attorney and "the task of supervising the construction of a new house at Belair." In 1747, Ogle returned to Maryland with his new bride to occupy his new home which was "the grandest in the region" visible from much of the surrounding area and "affording its owners a magnificent, all-encompassing view of their plantation." Ogle brought with him, two famous English horses and the first English-bred Thoroughbreds imported into Maryland, Queen Mab and Spark, both gifts of Lord Baltimore, establishing the Belair Stud.

The Ogle family maintained two residences upon return, one in town at the intersection of King George Street and College Avenue in Annapolis (now referred to as Ogle Hall, which houses the US Naval Academy's Alumni Hall) and Belair, the Governor's country seat.
Upon his death in 1752, Samuel Ogle left the following to his 3 year old son Benjamin Ogle:

Samuel Ogle had also named Tasker to be his son's guardian and manage the estate. At the age of 10, Benjamin Ogle was sent to England for formal education and returned 11 years later in 1770 to find Tasker's daughters and their husbands living in the estate. Ogle sued to have ownership and occupy the mansion. The court ruled in his favor in 1774 and he took possession of the estate.

Benjamin Ogle became a friend of George Washington whose presidential records show he dined at Belair on October 1, 1773, and that Washington frequently sought Ogle's counsel.

Post Revolution to Civil War
Benjamin Ogle operated Belair and gained prominence as a gentleman. He was elected Governor of Maryland in 1798. That same year the Direct Federal Tax assessment listed Belair as containing:

He continued to prosper until his death in 1809 when the property was inherited by his son, Benjamin Ogle II. Ogle II operated the estate and stud farm until his death in 1844 when his two sons, George Cooke Ogle and Richard Lowndes Ogle divided the estate into two parcels. George took the parcel with the mansion and Richard moved to a house on his parcel known as Bladen (which was torn down in the 1960s to make way for the Kenilworth Elementary School). When George took possession of the deed to Belair, it carried an interesting restriction: George's youngest sister, Rosalie Ogle, must be able to remain in her room in the mansion as long as she remained single. She chose a large room of 17 by 20 feet on the upper floor.

Civil War and end of Ogle ownership
As Belair was a slave-operated plantation, the ratification of the Maryland Constitution of 1864 which emancipated the slaves in the state effectively ended its operation as a plantation. In 1867, Dr. George C. Ogle reported to the Maryland State Commissioner of Slave Statistics that he had freed 41 slaves, 24 of them 18 years or younger.  Belair, like other plantations, was "possessed of huge tracts of land but suddenly without the built-in workforce to make them productive, they were often unable to meet mortgage debts or to pay taxes."  By 1870, the house had fallen into bad repair and George Ogle was in debt of $7,400 to his brother-in-law William Henry Tayloe of Virginia as well as several lesser debts to others including $2,400 to the estate of Maria Jackson, being executed by James Mullikin. In 1871 Ogle defaulted on the latter debt, Mullikin filed suit and the court ruled the Belair be sold to satisfy the debt. The property was described in the auction notices as:

The property was sold to the executors of the estate of the mortgage holder, William Henry Tayloe on May 16, 1871. The winning bidders were Thomas Munford and Henry Augustine Tayloe II who paid $5,100 but the contingency remained on the deed and Rosalie Ogle remained in the house. When tenant farmers moved in the mansion alongside Rosalie, she took them to court stating that she could not live in a house with people so far below her station. In 1877, she was awarded a cash settlement, and the last of the Ogle family retreated to Baltimore.

Changing hands

In 1877, Munford and Tayloe sold the property for $17,000 to Edward T. Rutter. Belair subsequently changed hands numerous times while it continued to fall further into disrepair. The property was divided into smaller parcels, some of which were then recombined. By 1896, ownership of most of the land had passed to Benjamin N. Hardisty.

Woodward era

James T. Woodward

In 1898, Hardesty's land was surveyed to be  including the mansion and the stables and was purchased for $10 and an undisclosed sum by wealthy banker James T. Woodward. James maintained residences in New York, Rhode Island as well as at Belair. During this time, he developed a very close relationship with Saint John's College in Annapolis and was elected to its board of visitors. Woodward invested significantly in both repairing Belair and expanding St. John's during this time. He died in 1910 having never married.

William Woodward Sr.

His nephew, wealthy lawyer and banker, William Woodward Sr. inherited the estate in 1910 and expanded the building in 1914 to a five-part house by the additions of two wings and hyphens. The expansion became a noted work of the architects Delano & Aldrich. During this period, William opportunistically bought up adjacent tracts of land including purchases from the Magruder family and the nearby Fairview Plantation of Oden Bowie and began developing the Belair Stud.

In 1918, he entered his first two-year-olds into competition, and in 1923 Sunny Jim Fitzsimmons arrived at Belair as trainer who eventually brought the Belair Stud two Triple Crown champions, a feat matched by only one other stable. Woodward died in 1953, leaving the estate to his son William Woodward Jr.

William Woodward Jr.

Woodward Jr. became an avid horse racing enthusiast. After his father's death, he took over operation of Belair for a brief period before he was fatally shot in his Oyster Bay, New York estate by his wife in 1955.

Belair development
Levitt used the building and the stables as corporate offices as they developed their suburban housing development, "Belair at Bowie." Bowie's city hall relocated out of the mansion in 1978.

Forty years after its construction, the Belair Development was listed on the Maryland Inventory of Historic Sites.

Present operation
The mansion, located at 12207 Tulip Grove Drive in Bowie, Maryland, is owned by the City of Bowie and functions as a museum, as does the nearby Belair Stable Museum.
Both the mansion and stables are listed separately on the National Register of Historic Places.

Architectural details
Based on Palladian architecture stressing symmetry, the original structure has two long façades featuring a central door and balanced number of windows on each side. Four chimneys support nine fireplaces.

From the National Register of Historic Places Inventory Nomination Form:

Cemetery

At the edge of the mansion grounds is a small cemetery containing the grave of Benjamin Ogle II whose tombstone states that he died on April 4, 1845 while other sources have him dying in 1844.

Others interred:
Ogle II's wife Anna Maria Cooke Ogle (1777–1856)
Benjamin Ogle III (1796–1839) who committed suicide following financial failure.
Priscilla Mackall Ogle (1825–1859)
Anna Maria Ogle (1849–1851)

See also
 Foxhill Park
 Belair Stable Museum
 Belair Stud

Bibliography

Notes

External links
National Register of Historic Places
The City of Bowie, Maryland
City of Bowie: Museums
Belair Historical Marker

1740s establishments in Maryland
Buildings and structures in Bowie, Maryland
Calvert family residences
Delano & Aldrich buildings
Historic American Buildings Survey in Maryland
Historic house museums in Maryland
Horse farms in Maryland
Houses in Prince George's County, Maryland
Houses on the National Register of Historic Places in Maryland
Museums in Prince George's County, Maryland
National Register of Historic Places in Prince George's County, Maryland
Plantation houses in Maryland
Tayloe family residences
Tasker family
Governor of Maryland